Matthias Pennypacker Farm, also known as Tinker Dam Farm, is a historic farmhouse located in Schuylkill Township, Chester County, Pennsylvania. It consists of two sections in the shape of an "L" and in the Georgian style.  It is constructed of rubble masonry and has a slate gable roof.  The older section pre-dates the American Revolution and is two stories and two bays wide.  The main portion is dated to 1830, and is three stories high and five bays wide. Also on the property are a small stone smokehouse, spring house, root cellar, and large stone barn measuring 40 feet by 60 feet and dated to 1830.

It was listed on the National Register of Historic Places in 1977.

References 
 

Houses on the National Register of Historic Places in Pennsylvania
Georgian architecture in Pennsylvania
Houses completed in 1830
Houses in Chester County, Pennsylvania
1830 establishments in Pennsylvania
National Register of Historic Places in Chester County, Pennsylvania